RP-Sanjiv Goenka Group (also known as RPSG Group) is an Indian multinational conglomerate headquartered in Kolkata. It was founded by Sanjiv Goenka, the younger son of Rama Prasad Goenka, on 13 July 2011. The Group's businesses include power and energy, carbon black manufacturing, retail, IT-enabled services, FMCG, media and entertainment, infrastructure and education.

History and Acquisitions

Rama Prasad Goenka established RPG Enterprises in 1979 with Phillips Carbon Black, Asian Cables, Agarpara Jute, and Murphy India as the constituents.

In 1981, the group acquired CEAT Tyres India. KEC International was acquired in 1982. In 1986, it acquired the music company Gramophone Company of India Ltd, now known as Saregama. Harrisons Malayalam, the tea and rubber plantations was acquired in 1988. In the following year, Calcutta Electric Supply Corporation (CESC Limited), Raychem Technologies, and Spencer's were acquired.

In 1993, Noida Power Company Limited (NPCL) was formed as a JV between the group and Greater Noida Industrial Development Authority, to distribute power in the Greater Noida region. In 2009, the Group entered into media with the launch of Open Magazine, a weekly current affairs and features magazine.

In 2010, the Group's businesses were divided between Rama Prasad Goenka's sons, Harsh Goenka and Sanjiv Goenka. RP-Sanjiv Goenka Group was founded on 13 July 2011, with Sanjiv Goenka as its chairman.

Businesses and Brands

Power 

 CESC Limited: CESC Limited is engaged in the generation and distribution of electricity in Kolkata and Howrah, West Bengal.
 Haldia Energy Limited: A subsidiary of CESC, HEL operates two 300 MW coal based thermal power plants at Haldia in West Bengal.
 Dhariwal Infrastructure Limited: A subsidiary of CESC, DIL, operates two 300 MW coal based thermal power plants at Chandrapur in Maharashtra.
 Noida Power Company Limited: NPCL is a joint venture between RPSG Group and Greater Noida Industrial Development Authority that distribute power in the Greater Noida region.
 Integrated Coal Mining Ltd: ICML was formed by CESC to mine coal from the Sarisatolli coal block in Ranigunj, West Bengal, for captive supply of coal to its companies.
 Crescent Power Limited: CPL operates a coal washery and a thermal plant near Asansol in West Bengal.
 Surya Vidyut Limited: The renewable energy business of the Group consists of 156 MW of wind power and 27 MW of solar power.

IT-Enabled Services 

 Firstsource: Firstsource Solutions Limited is a provider business process management services. The company's segments include Banking, Financial Services and Insurance and Non-Banking, Financial Services and Insurance.

Media and Entertainment 

 Saregama India Ltd: It is India's oldest music label and sells a retro-styled digital music player called Carvaan Apart from music, Saregama also produces films under the brand name Yoodlee Films and multi-language Television content.
 Open: Open, the weekly current affairs and features magazine, is the flagship brand of Open Media Network, the media venture of the group.
 Fortune India: The group tied up with Fortune Media Group to publish Fortune in India. Fortune, a business magazine, was earlier published in India by the ABP Group.
 Editorji: Launched in 2018, Editorji is a digital news player, which delivers news across three formats of video, audio, and text. The Group has acquired a majority stake in the app, a move that marks its foray into the digital news media space.

Consumer and Retail 

 Too Yumm! - Guiltfree Industries Ltd: The group began selling low-calorie food and snacks in 2017. Too Yumm! was its first low-calorie option. Virat Kohli represented Too Yumm! as the face of the brand.
 Evita - Apricot Foods Limited: Apricot Foods Limited, under the brand name Evita, provides traditional and western snacks for the mass market. The Group picked up a controlling stake in the Gujarat-based packaged foods company in a bid to boost its eatables business
 Spencer's Retail: Spencer's Retail is a multi-format retailer company, which is providing a wide range of products across categories such as food, personal care, fashion, home essentials, specialty, and electrical and electronics to its consumers.
 Nature's Basket: Nature's Basket is an Indian grocery delivery chain of retail stores focused on gourmet food. The company is headquartered in Mumbai, India. It was acquired by Spencer's Retail Ltd, a part of RPSG Group in May 2019 from the Godrej Group in an all-cash deal.
 Dr. Vaidya's - Herbolab India Pvt Ltd: CESC Ventures, a part of RPSG Group, acquired a majority stake in Herbolab India Pvt Ltd, makers of ayurvedic medicines and products under the ‘Dr Vaidya's’ brand. The acquisition marks the Group's foray into the ayurvedic medicines and products category.

Education and Infrastructure 

 Quest Mall: The group made a debut in the luxury retail space with Quest Mall in 2013.
 Woodlands Hospital: The group has at least 80% equity stake in Woodlands Medical Centre through a court-approved restructuring of debt and equity of the firm that runs it.

Sports 

 Rising Pune Supergiants: An Indian Premier League franchise, participated in 2016 and 2017.
 ATK Mohun Bagan: The Group's first sports asset was ATK - a football club based in Kolkata, which competes in the Indian Super League. It acquired a majority stake in Mohun Bagan Football Club (India) Private Limited in 2020 and merged with ATK to form, ATK Mohun Bagan, that came into existence on 1 June 2020. ATK Mohun Bagan plays in Indian Super League.
 RPSG Mavericks Kolkata: RPSG Mavericks Kolkata is one of the six city-based teams in the Ultimate Table Tennis league, India's top league for table tennis.
 Lucknow Super Giants: An Indian Premier League franchise, which participated from the 2022 season.
 Durban's Super Giants: An SA20 franchise, which has competed since the inaugural season.

Plantation 

 Harrisons Malayalam Limited: HML is a plantation company producing tea and rubber besides crops like pineapple, cardamom, pepper and other spices. It has 6 tea estates, 5 tea factories, 5 rubber estates and 3 rubber factories. When the group's businesses were divided between the two brothers, the assets of Harrisons Malayalam was "vertically split" and put under two separate management teams.

References

External links

Electric power companies of India
Companies based in Kolkata
Conglomerate companies of India
Multinational companies headquartered in India
Indian companies established in 2011
Manufacturing companies established in 2011
2011 establishments in West Bengal
 
Goenka Family
Indian Premier League franchise owners